Tubridy Tonight is a talk show hosted by Ryan Tubridy that aired on RTÉ One for five seasons between 2004 and 2009. The programme featured guest interviews (usually three per show), audience participation and live music from both a guest music group and the house band. Tubridy Tonight aired every Saturday night, except during the summer months, directly after the main evening news. The show's house musical act was Clint Velour and the Camembert Quartet.

Tubridy Tonight was the first successful Saturday night chat show to be broadcast by RTÉ since the ending of Kenny Live in 1999. The programme had regular viewing figures of 450,000, however, the show also regularly fell victim to so-called "Saturday Night Syndrome", with The Late Late Show, broadcast on Friday nights, frequently featuring supposedly better guests. In 2009 Tubridy Tonight came to an end when RTÉ announced that Tubridy would succeed Pat Kenny as host of The Late Late Show for the following series, with the presenter describing Tubridy Tonight as "quite the odyssey".

Background
Upon Gay Byrne's retirement from The Late Late Show in 1999, RTÉ announced that Pat Kenny, host of his own Saturday night chat show, would be Byrne's replacement. Kenny Live had aired since 1988 and had been a staple of the RTÉ schedule since the first series. The departure of Pat Kenny to the Friday night slot left a gap in the schedule. Saturday Live, a programme that had originally aired in the late 1980s and featured a different host every week, was revived as a replacement. The second coming of the show proved unpopular and was ended after only one series. Following the axing of Saturday Live RTÉ declined to produce a Saturday night chat show, instead favouring to show a film after the main evening news. On 9 May 2004, RTÉ announced that Ryan Tubridy would host a new Saturday night chat show that coming autumn.

Tubridy Tonight made its debut on 16 October 2004 for an initial run of ten programmes. It featured Gráinne and Síle Seoige, Hector Ó hEochagáin and Royston Brady as the first interviewees. The programme received relatively good reviews, with Shane Hegarty of The Irish Times describing the show as having gotten off "to a ropey start but improved as it went along". Hegarty bemoaned the fact that the show was broadcast live as "it added nothing to the show apart from a weak caption competition for viewers and a distinct nervousness to the host." An element of the programme which included audience participation was described as a "meek replication of Graham Norton's old routine." The new chat show proved popular with audiences and, after the initial run of ten shows ended, another thirteen shows were commissioned thereby extending the first series.

Tubridy Tonight was broadcast from Studio 4 in the RTÉ Television Centre at Donnybrook, Dublin 4. That studio was also home to the show's Friday night rival The Late Late Show. As RTÉ's biggest, the studio holds 200 audience members.

Format

Tubridy Tonight was in RTÉ One's Saturday night slot from 2004 to 2009, having succeeded Kenny Live upon its demise in 1999. The show had an American-style feel about it with a house band, the Camembert Quartet, providing the theme music and introductory pieces befitting the guests. Similar to American chat shows, Tubridy Tonight had no opening titles and borrowed its informal bantering style from US entertainers such as David Letterman and Conan O'Brien. The studio was revamped for series five in 2008, with the addition of a staircase used by guests and a platform for the house band, although the library theme remained intact. The show followed a simple format. There were usually three interviewees as well as a musical guest. Tubridy may also have conducted a quiz or a game at his leisure with a member of the studio audience, an example being a game of charades based on the Academy Awards, and there also may have been a competition which, upon the show's imminent endage, consisted of a live call to a viewer who may or may not win a prize.

Incidents
Tubridy Tonight conducted the last live television interview with model and socialite, Katy French only two weeks before her death in suspicious circumstances. The interview took place on 24 November 2007 during the fourth season of the chat show. In 2008, it featured a live fight between chefs Kevin Dundon and Dylan McGrath over their styles of cooking; the duo were on the show to promote Guerrilla Gourmet. On 1 March 2008, Tubridy Tonight saw the first Irish television interview with Glen Hansard and Markéta Irglová following their Academy Award-winning show the previous month. Hansard's mother brought the award to display to the nation. In February 2009, the show was subject to a hate campaign on social networking site Facebook.

Broadcast dates

List of episodes

Seasons one and two

Interviews
Guests on the first two series' of the show included: Bob Geldof, Charles Dance, Bertie Ahern and Fine Gael leader Enda Kenny. Actress Brenda Fricker appeared with her Oscar and was shown playing drums with the house band. Former tennis player Pat Cash was shown playing guitar. Channel 4 newsreader Jon Snow sang The Beatles song "Hey Jude" and encouraged the audience to join in. Hollywood actor Richard E. Grant revealed his reason for appearing in Spiceworld: The Movie.

Also appearing were: comedian Ardal O'Hanlon, Irish international rugby captain Brian O'Driscoll, snooker players Dennis Taylor and Steve Davis, former Emmerdale and Bad Girls actress Claire King, Coronation Street actress Sally Lindsay, actor Jimmy Nesbitt, supermodel Twiggy, Naked Camera actor Maeve Higgins (who revealed why she wanted to marry Eddie Hobbs), West Wing actor Martin Sheen, actress Julie Walters, comedian Ross Noble (Who climbed the prop bookcases and inspected the books to see if they were real, before ripping out a picture of Mike Yarwood on one page and wearing it as a mask and television personality Hector Ó hEochagáin.

Musical guests included: Blondie, The Human League (singing "Don't You Want Me") and Natalie Imbruglia (singing "Shiver").

Guests included:

Performances
As is standard with televised talk shows, each week an artist was invited to perform a musical composition. Irish musical groups to appear included:

Irish soloists invited to perform their musical compositions included:

Season three
International guests in season three included: David Hasselhoff (who entertained the audience with an impromptu version of "Unchain My Heart"), Jack Osbourne, Ainsley Harriott, Paul Burrell, Martin Sheen, Julie Walters, Wendy Richard, Joshua Jackson, Fionnula Flanagan, Andy Summers, Pete Burns, Joanna Lumley and Belinda Carlisle.

Season four
International guests in season four included: Christian Slater, Jennie Bond, David Gest, Sophie Dahl, Myleene Klass, Janice Dickinson, Barbara Windsor, Frank Vincent, Dominic Purcell, Kathleen Turner, Martin Freeman, Carol Vorderman, Patsy Palmer, Max Clifford, Geri Halliwell, Joe Elliott and Morgan Spurlock.

Season five

International guests in season five included: William Shatner, Henry Winkler, Roger Moore, Richard and David Attenborough (on separate occasions), Paul Gascoigne, Spandau Ballet and a then-unknown singer called Lady Gaga. Former president Mary Robinson also appeared, as did Gay Byrne. David Hasselhoff made a return appearance to mark the final episode, as Tubridy moved to Friday nights and The Late Late Show.

Christmas shows
In 2006, Tubridy began travelling beyond The Pale to host his annual special Christmas show.

Critique
A poll found that, within five months of Tubridy Tonight going on air, 38 per cent of adults preferred Tubridy on television, compared with 40 per cent opting for his main rival, Pat Kenny, with whom the show competed for guests. Tubridy Tonight and its host also won praise from the former host of The Late Late Show, Gay Byrne. This led to some ponderings as to why Tubridy was left with substandard "dull" guests that did not befit his talent. Some guests opted to be interviewed by Tubridy instead of by Kenny on The Late Late Show. Competition between the two shows was analogous to similar competition in a previous decade between Byrne and Kenny.

A 2008 survey by The Times concluded that almost  of guests on RTÉ chat shows including Tubridy Tonight were RTÉ employees and associates. The survey did not include musical acts.

Online on RTE Player in 2022 for 60 Years of television.

Footnotes

References

External links
 Tubridy Tonight RTÉ.ie
 Pugwash perform "Tinsel and Marzipan" on Tubridy Tonight on YouTube
 Early review of Tubridy Tonight interview with Miriam Ahern Irish Independent – 20 November 2004
 

2004 Irish television series debuts
2009 Irish television series endings
Irish television talk shows
RTÉ original programming